Shaun Vernon du Preez (born ) is a Namibian rugby union player, currently playing with the Namibia national team and the  in the South African Currie Cup competition. He can play as a prop or a hooker.

Rugby career

Du Preez was born in Karasburg (then in South-West Africa, but part of modern-day Namibia) and attended Paarl Boys' High School in South Africa.

References

External links
 

Namibian rugby union players
Living people
1987 births
People from ǁKaras Region
Rugby union props
Rugby union hookers
Namibia international rugby union players